Riwal Cycling Team was a Danish UCI Continental cycling team based in Himmerland. Riwal participated in races in many countries around Europe. The team's most popular achievements have been the Danmark Rundt, the Olympia's Tour in the Netherlands and the Okolo Slovenska. The team had 10 full-time riders. Most of the team riders were Danish but also includes Swedish, Dutch and Norwegian members. The team had one sports manager and several freelancers. It was founded in 2009 and merged in 2023 with team Leopard Pro Cycling from Luxemburg, to form Leopard Riwal.

Team history
About 70 business partners support the Riwal Cycling Team by small and large sponsorships. The end of season 2013 Nikola Aistrup conquered the points in the first days of the Tour of Denmark and later he took second place in the final Post Cup department: The rider, who for years has been one of the backbones at Concordia Forsikring–Riwal has recently signed with the new team, which from 2014 ran under the Riwal name.

It was announced on 22 August 2020 that security company Securitas would step up as a co-name sponsor for the rest of the 2020 season.

Due to funding issues, the team decided it would return to being a UCI Continental team in 2021 to ensure its survival, after a two-year stint as a UCI ProTeam.

Team roster

Major wins

2010
Stage 8 Vuelta Mexico Telmex, Philip Nielsen
Scandinavian Race Uppsala, Philip Nielsen
2011
Stage 2b Le Triptyque des Monts et Châteaux, Rasmus Guldhammer
 Time Trial Championships, Rasmus Quaade
2012
Stage 1 Tour d'Algérie, Lars Andersson
2013
Stage 2 Tour de Normandie, Martin Mortensen
Stage 4 Okolo Slovenska, Martin Mortensen
2014
Scandinavian Race Uppsala, Jonas Aaen Jørgensen
Stages 3 & 4 Dookoła Mazowsza, Alex Rasmussen
2015
Scandinavian Race Uppsala, Nicolai Brøchner
2016
Himmerland Rundt, Jonas Gregaard
2017
Himmerland Rundt, Nicolai Brøchner
Ronde van Overijssel, Nicolai Brøchner
Scandinavian Race Uppsala, Nicolai Brøchner
2018
Stage 3 Flèche du Sud, Andreas Kron
Stage 2 Tour of Estonia, Andreas Stokbro
 U23 Time Trial Championships, Mathias Norsgaard
Chrono des Nations U23, Mathias Norsgaard
2019 
Fyen Rundt, Rasmus Quaade
Scandinavian Race Uppsala, Rasmus Bøgh Wallin
Stage 1 Tour de Normandie, Nicolai Brøchner
Stage 2 Circuit des Ardennes, Alexander Kamp
Stage 3 Tour de Yorkshire, Alexander Kamp
 Road Race Championships, Lucas Eriksson
2020 
Stage 5 Tour de Luxembourg, Andreas Kron
 Road Race Championships, Kim Magnusson
2021
 Overall Kreiz Breizh Elites, Nick van der Lijke
Skive–Løbet, Elmar Reinders
PWZ Zuidenveld Tour, Elmar Reinders
Stage 4 Tour de Bretagne, Elmar Reinders
 Overall Circuit des Ardennes, Lucas Eriksson
Stage 1, Lucas Eriksson
2022
Visit Friesland Elfsteden Race, Elmar Reinders
Stage 3 Olympia's Tour, Elmar Reinders
 Overall Circuit des Ardennes, Lucas Eriksson
Stage 1, Elmar Reinders
Arno Wallaard Memorial, Elmar Reinders
Stage 5 Tour de Bretagne, Elmar Reinders

References

External links
 

Former UCI Professional Continental teams
UCI Continental Teams (Europe)
Cycling teams based in Denmark
Cycling teams established in 2009